Juan Perillo (born April 9, 1985 in Buenos Aires) is an Argentine footballer who is currently a free agent.

External links
 Juan Manuel Perillo at BDFA.com.ar 
 

1985 births
Living people
Footballers from Buenos Aires
Argentine footballers
Argentine expatriate footballers
Association football forwards
Once Caldas footballers
Club Universitario de Deportes footballers
Pierikos F.C. players
Categoría Primera A players
Peruvian Primera División players
Expatriate footballers in Colombia
Expatriate footballers in Peru
Expatriate footballers in Greece
Argentine expatriate sportspeople in Colombia
Argentine expatriate sportspeople in Peru
Argentine expatriate sportspeople in Greece